The office of Minister for Defence has been one of the most important in the breakaway Republic of Abkhazia due to the ongoing conflict with Georgia. The person in the position heads the Ministry of Defence of Abkhazia, which controls the Abkhazian Armed Forces.

History
The position was created 11 October 1992, shortly after the outbreak of the 1992-1993 war with Georgia. The first Minister for Defence was Vladimir Arshba, but due to his injuries, for most of the time his functions were carried out by Deputy Minister for Defence and Chief of the General Staff Sultan Sosnaliev, who eventually also formally succeeded Arshba on 25 April 2003. Sosnaliev oversaw Abkhazia's successful expulsion of Georgian forces and remained Defence Minister until on 1 July 1996 he resigned to return to his native Kabardia.

Sosnaliev's successor was Vladimir Mikanba, who held the position during the May 1998 war in the Gali district and the October 2001 incursion of Chechen fighters down the Kodori valley.

Mikanba was succeeded by Raul Khajimba, who would go on to become Prime Minister, and who is the current Vice President of Abkhazia. 22 April 2003, when Khajimba became Prime Minister, Viacheslav Eshba became Minister for Defence. On 8 November 2004, during the height of the crisis following the 2004 Presidential election, a source within the government claimed that Eshba had been replaced by Mukhamed Kilba, the deputy chief of Khajimba's presidential campaign, but this was denied by Prime Minister Nodar Khashba.

On 25 February 2005, newly elected President Sergei Bagapsh called on Sultan Sosnaliev to become Defence Minister once more. Sosnaliev agreed and held the office until shortly after his 65th birthday on 8 May 2007 he resigned for personal reasons.

On 26 June 2007 then Deputy Defence Minister Mirab Kishmaria was appointed Sosnaliev's successor. During the August 2008 war in South Ossetia, he oversaw the Abkhazian conquest of so-called Upper Abkhazia, the only part of Abkhazia that had remained under Georgian control since the 1992-1993 war. Kishmaria remains Minister of Defence until the present day.

List of people to hold the office

See also

Military of Abkhazia
President of Abkhazia
Vice President of Abkhazia
Prime Minister of Abkhazia
Minister for Foreign Affairs of Abkhazia

References

Politics of Abkhazia